En julhälsning från Cyndee is a 1986 Cyndee Peters Christmas album. In 1991, the album was re-released on CD.

Track listing
Hosianna  (Adventshymn) - Georg Joseph Vogler
Dotter Sion (Judas maccabaeus) - Georg Friedrich Händel
Marias vaggsång (Maria går i rosengård) - Max Reger, Evelyn Lindström
Jul i gamla sta'n (Billy Butt, Monica Forsberg)
Jul, jul, strålande jul - Gustav Nordqvist, Edvard Evers
Vägen till en vän (That's What Friends Are For) - Burt Bacharach, Carole Bayer Sager, Ingela Forsman
O Holy Night (Cantique de Noel) - Adolphe Adam
Children Go Where I Send Thee (trad.)
Silent Night (Stille Nacht, Heilige Nacht) - Franz Gruber
O Come All Ye Faithful (Adeste fideles) - John Francis, Frederick Oakeley
One Day, One Peace, One Love - Eric Bibb
Soon and Very Soon - Andraé Crouch
Mary Had a Baby - negro spiritual

Charts

References 

1986 Christmas albums
Christmas albums by Swedish artists
Cyndee Peters albums
Swedish-language albums
Gospel Christmas albums